Jack Francis "Junior" Stephens (May 18, 1933 – August 31, 2011) was an American basketball player.  He played one season in the National Basketball Association (NBA).

Stephens, a guard from Mount Carmel High School in Chicago, played college basketball at the University of Notre Dame from 1951 to 1955.  He was a standout for the Irish, raising his scoring average each year.  In his senior season of 1954–55, Stephens averaged 20.9 points per game and was named an All-American by the United Press International (third team) and Collier's (second team).

He tied the Irish single-game scoring record with 35 points against Marquette in his final career game for Notre Dame. Stephens served as captain of the '54–55 Irish. Stephens played on Irish teams that finished 19–5 and 22–3 and qualified for the NCAA Championships his sophomore and junior years, respectively. In 1953 he was named to the NCAA All-Mideast Regional team.

Stephens also played one year of football for the Irish at halfback. After graduation, Stephens was drafted by the St. Louis Hawks in the second round (7th pick overall) of the 1955 NBA draft.  He played one season for the Hawks, averaging 10.3 points and 5.2 rebounds per game in 72 appearances. 
Stephens later served as president of the University of Notre Dame Monogram Club from 1993 to 1994. On November 4, 2004, Stephens was named to the Irish All-Century Team.

Jack Stephens died on August 31, 2011, in Peoria, Illinois.

References

External links
 

1933 births
2011 deaths
All-American college men's basketball players
Basketball players from Chicago
Forwards (basketball)
Guards (basketball)
Notre Dame Fighting Irish men's basketball players
St. Louis Hawks draft picks
St. Louis Hawks players
American men's basketball players